Arnod Gerrit Niekoop is a former Surinamese football player, referee and board member of the Surinamese Football Association, as well as board member and former chairman of the Surinamese Refereeing Commission.

During his playing career he played in the Surinamese Hoofdklasse for S.V. Robinhood and M.V.V., and for the Suriname national team. He spent most of his professional playing career with S.V. Robinhood, winning five national titles, finishing as the league top scorer in 1964.

Career

SV Robinhood
Born in Diitabiki, Surinam, Niekoop joined S.V. Robinhood in 1954. Playing together with Humphrey Mijnals, Siegfried Haltman and Kenneth Kluivert during his career with Robinhood, he helped form the dangerous attack of Robinhood, only rivaled by S.V. Transvaal at the time. In 1964 he led Robinhood to an undefeated season, winning the National championship and finishing as the leagues top goal scorer that same season.

MVV
In 1966, he joined M.V.V. (Militaire Voetbal Vereniging), the football club of the military. He would continue his goal scoring habits at his new club, playing with the likes of Armand Doesburg and George Headley, who were considered a dangerous attacking tandem.

International career

Suriname
Niekoop played for the Suriname national team, playing in the nation's first Olympic qualifiers following the foundation of the Surinamese Olympic Committee (S.O.C.) in 1959.

He made his first appearance in a friendly match on 20 September 1959 against Martinique scoring the winning goal on his debut. On 20 March 1964, he scored the equalizer in a 2–2 draw with the Netherlands Antilles in the countries first Olympic qualifying match. Niekoop scored additional goals in both losses against Argentina and Peru, before Suriname were eliminated in the second round. He also played in the CCCF Championship as well as the countries 1966 FIFA World Cup qualifying campaign.

Refereeing career
Following his playing career, Niekoop became a referee in the SVB Hoofdklasse in Suriname. Licensed by both FIFA and CONCACAF, Niekoop has refereed for International tournaments, including the 2008 CONCACAF Women's U-17 Championship and the 2012 CONCACAF Men's Olympic qualifiers.

As a member of the Surinamese Refereeing Commission, he became the chairman of the board, as well as a board member of the Surinamese Football Association.
 No longer the chairman, he is still a member of the board and has been involved in the official training and licensing of referees in Suriname by FIFA.

In June 2012, Niekoop was present when former Jungle Commando leader and owner of football club Inter Moengotapoe, Ronnie Brunswijk took to the pitch with a gun, during a match against S.V. Transvaal, in which Transvaal had been awarded a free kick. Then manager Brunswijk was unhappy with the call by the referee and became violent, waving a gun at several of the players. It was Niekoop who took to the pitch and calmed Brunswijk down preventing any further harm. Niekoop filed a detailed report of the incident to the governing body of FIFA, who in turn suspended Brunswijk for two seasons without permission to enter his stadium. Furthermore, SVB officials would no longer officiate matches at the Ronnie Brunswijkstadion for the remainder of the season, until more intensive measures towards safety were taken by the club.

Career statistics

International goals
Scores and results list Suriname' goal tally first.

Honors

Club
S.V. Robinhood
 SVB Hoofdklasse (5): 1955, 1956, 1959, 1961, 1964

Individual
SVB Hoofdklasse Top Goalscorer (1): 1964

References 

1934 births
Living people
Surinamese footballers
Suriname international footballers
S.V. Robinhood players
Sportvereniging Nationaal Leger players
SVB Eerste Divisie players
Surinamese football referees
Association football forwards